In the European High Middle Ages, the typical sword (sometimes academically categorized as the knightly sword, arming sword, or in full, knightly arming sword) was a straight, double-edged weapon with a single-handed, cruciform (i.e., cross-shaped) hilt and a blade length of about . This type is frequently depicted in period artwork, and numerous examples have been preserved archaeologically.

The high medieval sword of the Romanesque period (10th to 13th centuries) developed gradually from the Viking sword of the 9th century.
In the Late Medieval period (14th and 15th centuries), late forms of these swords continued to be used, but often as a sidearm, at that point called "arming swords" and contrasting with the two-handed, heavier longswords.

Though the majority of late-medieval arming swords kept their blade properties from previous centuries, there are also surviving specimens from the 15th century that took the form of a late-medieval estoc, specialised for use against more heavily armoured opponents. After the end of the medieval period, the arming sword developed into several forms of the early modern one-handed straight swords, such as the side-sword, the rapier, the cavalry-focused Reiterschwert and certain types of broadsword.

Terminology
The term "arming sword" is first used in the 15th century to refer to the single-handed type of sword after it had ceased to serve as the main weapon and was on its way to being used as a side-sword.
"Arming sword" in late medieval usage specifically refers to the  when worn as a side-arm, but as a modern term it may also refer to any single-handed sword in a late medieval context.
The terms "knight's sword" or "knightly sword" are modern terms to specify the sword of the high medieval period.

Period terminology for swords is somewhat fluid. Mostly, the common type of sword in any given period would simply be referred to as "sword" (English , French , Latin  etc.).
During the high medieval period, references to swords as "great sword" or "small" or "short sword" does not necessarily indicate their morphology, but simply their relative size.
Oakeshott (1964) notes that this changes in the late medieval period, beginning towards the end of the 13th century, when the "bastard sword" appeared as an early type of what developed into the 15th-century longsword.

The term "romanesque sword" does not see significant use in English, but it is more current in French, German, and especially in Slavic languages (such as Czech ), identifying the swords as being contemporary with the corresponding Romanesque period in art history (roughly 1000 to 1300).

History

The knightly sword develops in the 11th century from the Viking sword.
The most evident morphological development is the appearance of the crossguard. The transitional swords of the 11th century are also known as Norman swords.
Already in the 10th century, some of the "finest and most elegant" of the Ulfberht type of "Viking" (actually Carolingian/Frankish) swords began to exhibit a more slender blade geometry, moving the center of mass closer to the hilt to improve wieldability.

The one-handed sword of the high medieval period was typically used with a shield or buckler.
In the late medieval period, when the longsword came to predominate, the single-handed sword was retained as a common sidearm, especially of the estoc type, and came to be referred to as an "arming sword", later evolving into the cut and thrust swords of the Renaissance.

At the end of the medieval period, the estoc arming sword develops into the Spanish  and the Italian , the predecessors of the early modern rapier. This type influenced the development of the early modern basket-hilted sword which in turn developed into the modern (Napoleonic era) cavalry sword.

Morphology

The most widespread typology for the medieval sword was developed by Ewart Oakeshott in 1960, mostly based on blade morphology. Oakeshott (1964) introduced an additional typology for pommel shapes.

A more recent typology is due to Geibig (1991). Geibig's typology focuses on swords from continental the transitional period from the early to the high medieval period (early 8th to late 12th centuries) and does not extend to the late medieval period.

Pommels were most commonly of the 'Brazil-nut' type from around 1000–1200 AD, with the 'wheel' pommel appearing in the 11th and predominating from the 13th to 15th centuries.

However, Oakeshott (1991) is emphatic on the point that a medieval sword cannot conclusively be dated based on its morphology. While there are some general trends in the development of fashion, many of the most popular styles of pommels, hilts and blades remain in use throughout the duration of the High Middle Ages.

Blade
The common "knightly swords" of the high medieval period (11th to early 12th centuries) fall under types X to XII.

Type X is the Norman sword as it developed out of the early medieval Viking sword by the 11th century.

Type XI shows the development towards a more tapering point seen during the 12th century.

Type XII is a further development, typical throughout the Crusades period, showing a tapering blade with a shortened fuller. Subtype XIIa comprises the longer and more massive "great-swords" which developed in the mid-13th century, probably designed to counter improvements in mail armour; these are the predecessors of the late medieval longsword (see also Cawood sword).

Type XIII is the knightly sword typical of the later 13th century.
Swords of this type have long, wide blades with parallel edges, terminating in a rounded or spatulate tip, and with a lens-shaped cross-section.
The hilts become somewhat longer, about 15 cm, to allow occasional two-handed use.
The pommels are mostly of the brazil-nut or disk shapes.
Subtype XIIIa has longer blades and hilts. These are the knightly "great-swords", or Grans espées d'Allemagne which seamlessly develop into the longsword type in the 14th century. Subtype XIIIb describes smaller single-handed swords of similar shape.

The form classified as type XIV develops towards the very end of the high medieval period, around 1270, and remained popular during the early decades of the 14th century. They are often depicted on the tomb effigies of English knights of the period, but there are few surviving specimens.
Continuations of the knightly sword as the "arming sword" type of the late medieval period correspond to Oakeshott types XV, XVI and XVIII.

Pommel
Oakeshott's pommel typology groups medieval pommel shapes into 24 categories (some with subtypes).
Type A is the "brazil-nut" shape inherited from the classical "Viking sword".
Type B includes more rounded forms of A, including the "mushroom" or "tea-cosy" shape.
Type C is the "cocked-hat" shape also found in Viking swords, with D, E and F derived variants of C.

Type G is the disk-pommel found very frequently in medieval swords. Type H is a variant of the disk pommel, with the edges chamfered off. This is one of the most frequently found shapes throughout the 10th to 15th centuries. I, J and K are derived variants of the disk pommel.

Types L to S are rare shapes, in many cases difficult to date.
Type L has a trefoil-like shape; it is possibly limited to Spain in the 12th to 13th centuries.
Type M is a special derived variant of the multi-lobed pommel of the Viking Age, found only in a very limited number of swords (see Cawood sword).
Types P ("shield-shaped") and Q ("flower-shaped") are not even known to be attested in any surviving sword and known only from period artwork. R is a spherical pommel, known only from a few specimens.

Types T to Z are pommel shapes used in the late medieval period;
T is the "fig" or "pear" or "scent-stopper" shape, first used in the early 14th century, but seen with any frequency only after 1360, with numerous derived forms well into the 16th century. U is a "key-shaped" type used only in the second half of the 15th century.
V is the "fish-tail" pommel, used in the 15th century. Z is the "cat's head" shape apparently used exclusively in Venice.

Blade inscriptions
Many European sword blades of the high medieval period have blade inscriptions. Inscribed blades were particularly popular during the 12th century. Many of these inscriptions are garbled strings of letters, often apparently inspired by religious formulae, especially the phrase in nomine domini and the word benedictus or benedicat.

The 12th-century fashion for blade inscriptions is based on the earlier, 9th to 11th century, tradition of the so-called Ulfberht swords. A single stray find from Eastern Germany, dated to the late 11th or possibly early 12th century, combines both an Ulfberht and an in nomine domini (in this case, +IINIOMINEDMN) inscription.<ref>Herrman, J. and Donat P. (eds.), Corpus archäologischer Quellen zur Frühgeschichte auf dem Gebiet der Deutschen Demokratischen Republik (7.-12. Jahrhundert), Akademie-Verlag, Berlin (1985), p. 376.</ref>

Many blade inscriptions of the later 12th and 13th centuries are even more indecipherable, bearing no resemblance to the in nomine domini phrase,  sometimes resembling random strings of letters, such as ERTISSDXCNERTISSDX, +NDXOXCHWDRGHDXORVI+,+IHININIhVILPIDHINIhVILPN+ (Pernik sword).

In media
 Knightly swords were used by many characters on The Hobbit and The Lord of the Rings including Aragon, Gandalf, Eowyn, and Bard.
 Peter Pevensie used a knightly sword given by Father Christmas on The Chronicles of Narnia such as The Lion, the Witch and the Wardrobe, Prince Caspian, and The Last Battle. The version on the film series owns a lion-themed pommel in honour of Aslan, and was used by Edmund on the film version of The Voyage of the Dawn Treader.
 Optimus Prime used a knightly sword on Transformers: Age of Extinction and Transformers: The Last Knight.

See also
Types of swords
Oakeshott typology
Imperial Sword
Lobera (sword)
Szczerbiec
Norman sword
Longsword

Notes

References

Oakeshott,  Ewart (1964), The Sword in the Age of Chivalry.

Geibig, A. (1991), Beiträge zur morphologischen Entwicklung des Schwertes im Mittelalter.
North, Anthony (1994), "Swords and Hilt Weapons" in: Anne Cope (ed.), Swords and Hilt Weapons.
Peirce, Ian (1990), "The Development of the Medieval Sword c.850–1300", in Christopher Harper-Bill, Ruth Harvey (eds.), The Ideals and Practice of Medieval Knighthood III: Papers from the Fourth Strawberry Hill Conference, 1988, Boydell & Brewer Ltd, pp. 139–158.
Schulze-Dörrlamm (1995). Das Reichsschwert: Ein Herrschaftszeichen des Saliers Heinrich IV. und des Welfen Otto IV. Jan Thorbecke Verlag Sigmaringen.
Seitz, H. (1967). Blankwaffen 1''. Braunschweig: Klinkhardt and Biermann.

Medieval European swords

ru:Романский меч